Bulganbaatar is a Central Asian mammal genus from the Upper Cretaceous.  It existed in the company of dinosaurs.  This animal was a member of the extinct order Multituberculata. It's within the suborder Cimolodonta and is a member of the superfamily Djadochtatherioidea. The genus Bulganbaatar was named by Kielan-Jaworowska Z. in 1974.

Fossil remains of the species Bulganbaatar nemegtbaataroides, also named by Kielan-Jaworowska, have been found in Upper Cretaceous-aged strata of the Djadokhta Formation of Mongolia and Kazakhstan.

References
 Kielan-Jaworowska (1974), "Multituberculate succession in the Late Cretaceous of the Gobi Desert (Mongolia)". Palaeontologica Polonica 30, p. 23-44.
 Kielan-Jaworowska Z & Hurum JH (2001), "Phylogeny and Systematics of multituberculate mammals". Paleontology 44, p. 389-429.
 Much of this information has been derived from  MESOZOIC MAMMALS; Djadochtatherioidea, an Internet directory.

Cimolodonts
Late Cretaceous mammals of Asia
Prehistoric mammal genera